Whirld Tour 2010: Live in London is the third live album by the progressive rock supergroup Transatlantic. Released in 2010, it documents the May 21, 2010, show by the band at Shepherd's Bush Empire, London, England. The show was also filmed and released on a two-DVD set with additional performances (including a cover of the Genesis song "The Return of the Giant Hogweed" with Steve Hackett) and documentary footage. This was the second-to-last show of the "Whirld Tour" (not counting their appearance at The High Voltage Festival) in support of the band's third studio album, The Whirlwind.

Daniel Gildenlöw of Pain of Salvation returns this tour, playing additional keyboards, guitars, percussion, and vocals throughout the show.

Like their previous live albums, this set features 6 songs, however because of the amount of material the band had thus far, no cover songs are featured (although bits of covers are scattered throughout the show, including Deep Purple's "Highway Star", Santana's "Soul Sacrifice", and even the McDonald's theme).

Track listing
All songs by Neal Morse/Roine Stolt/Mike Portnoy/Pete Trewavas unless otherwise noted.

Personnel
 Neal Morse – lead vocals, keyboards, guitar
 Roine Stolt – guitar, vocals
 Pete Trewavas – bass guitar, vocals
 Mike Portnoy – drums, vocals
 Daniel Gildenlöw – additional keyboards, additional guitar, additional percussion, lead vocals on "Almost Home", backing vocals

Charts

References

Transatlantic (band) albums
2010 live albums